Éctor Jaime Ramírez Barba (born 1 December 1956) is a Mexican surgeon and politician affiliated with the National Action Party. As of 2014 he served as Deputy of the LX Legislature of the Mexican Congress representing Guanajuato.

References

1956 births
Living people
Politicians from Guanajuato
People from León, Guanajuato
Mexican surgeons
Members of the Chamber of Deputies (Mexico)
National Action Party (Mexico) politicians
21st-century Mexican politicians
Universidad de Guanajuato alumni
Academic staff of Universidad de Guanajuato